LIBRA - Party of Liberal Democrats ( or LIBRA for short, also spelled Libra) was a short-lived Croatian social-liberal political party active between September 2002 and August 2005. During its existence the party ran in only one parliamentary election, in 2003, and won three seats in the 151-seat 5th Assembly of the Croatian Parliament.

LIBRA was formed in July 2002 and formally registered in September that year, following a split in the Croatian Social Liberal Party (HSLS) when a faction led by Jozo Radoš, then defence minister in the Cabinet of Ivica Račan I, opposed HSLS leader Dražen Budiša's decision to leave the ruling five-party centre-left coalition dominated by SDP, in the hopes of provoking an early election. However, then Prime Minister Ivica Račan managed to avoid a fresh election by forming a reconstructed Cabinet of Ivica Račan II on 30 July 2002, with the newly formed LIBRA holding two seats in the cabinet - Goran Granić as Deputy Prime Minister, and Roland Žuvanić as Minister for Maritime Affairs, Transport and Communications.

Until the end of the 4th Assembly in October 2003, the party was represented in the Croatian Parliament with nine members, all former HSLS members, with Ivo Škrabalo as head of the party club.

LIBRA then ran in the November 2003 election as a junior partner in a centre-left coalition with Social Democratic Party (SDP), Istrian Democratic Assembly (IDS) and the Liberal Party (LS). The coalition lost the election to the centre-right Croatian Democratic Union (HDZ), winning a total of 43 seats in a 151-seat parliament, out of which only 3 belonged to LIBRA.

In February 2005 party members voted to merge with the Croatian People's Party (HNS) which changed its name in Croatian People's Party - Liberal Democrats (HNS-LD or, more commonly, just HNS). Two of LIBRA's MPs in the 5th Assembly, Jozo Radoš and Vilim Herman, joined HNS, while the third, Željko Pavlic, resigned his party membership to become independent.

In August 2005 the party was formally struck from the party register.

Election history
The following is a summary of the party's results in legislative elections for the Croatian Parliament.

See also
Liberalism in Croatia
Croatian People's Party – Liberal Democrats

References

Liberal parties in Croatia
Social liberal parties
Defunct political parties in Croatia
Political parties established in 2002
Political parties disestablished in 2005
2005 disestablishments in Croatia
2002 establishments in Croatia